Larëvat is an Oceanic language of central Malekula, Vanuatu.

The current population of Larëvat-speaking villages is estimated at around 675 speakers. They are located around Losinwei, which is also  known as the "neck of the dog" due to the island looking like a sitting dog.

References

Malekula languages
Languages of Vanuatu